Cnemaspis phangngaensis, also known as the Phang Nga rock gecko, is a species of gecko endemic to Thailand.

References

Cnemaspis
Fauna of Thailand
Reptiles described in 2017